The Eastern Mediterranean Health Journal is a healthcare journal published by the Eastern Mediterranean Regional office of World Health Organization of the World Health Organization. It covers research in the area of public health and related biomedical or technical subjects, with particular relevance to the Eastern Mediterranean region. It was established in 1995 and articles are in Arabic, English, or French.

Scope
The Eastern Mediterranean region, as covered by the journal, includes Afghanistan, Bahrain, Djibouti, Egypt, Islamic Republic of Iran, Iraq, Jordan, Kuwait, Lebanon, Libyan Arab Jamahiriya, Morocco, Oman, Pakistan, Palestine, Qatar, Saudi Arabia, Somalia, South Sudan, Sudan, Syrian Arab Republic, Tunisia, United Arab Emirates, and Yemen.

Abstracting and indexing
The journal is abstracted and indexed in:

It is registered on the Cochrane Collaboration master journal list.

See also
 Eastern Mediterranean Regional office of World Health Organization
 Bulletin of the World Health Organization
 Human Resources for Health
 Pan American Journal of Public Health
 World Health Report

References

External links

Public health journals
Multilingual journals
World Health Organization academic journals
Eastern Mediterranean
Publications established in 1995
Monthly journals